Lesle Lewis may refer to:

 Lesle Lewis (composer) (born 1960), Indian singer and composer
 Lesle Lewis (author),  American poet and professor

See also 
 Leslie Lewis (disambiguation)